The equity ratio is a financial ratio indicating the relative proportion of equity used to finance a company's assets. The two components are often taken from the firm's balance sheet or statement of financial position (so-called book value), but the ratio may also be calculated using market values for both, if the company's equities are publicly traded.

The equity ratio is a very common financial ratio, especially in Central Europe and Japan, while in the US the debt to equity ratio is more often used in financial (research) reports.

Interpretation

The Equity Ratio is a good indicator of the level of leverage used by a company. The Equity Ratio measures the proportion of the total assets that are financed by stockholders, as opposed to creditors. A low equity ratio will produce good results for stockholders as long as the company earns a rate of return on assets that is greater than the interest rate paid to creditors.

References

Financial ratios